Solanum americanum, commonly known as American black nightshade, small-flowered nightshade or glossy nightshade, is a herbaceous flowering plant of wide though uncertain native range. The certain native range encompasses the tropics and subtropics of the Americas, Melanesia, New Guinea, and Australia.

The plant is widely naturalised around the tropical Pacific and Indian Oceans, including Hawaii, Indochina, Madagascar and Africa, possibly via anthropogenic introduction in these locales.

Solanum americanum is one of the most widespread and morphologically variable species belonging to the section Solanum. It can be confused with other black nightshade species in the Solanum nigrum complex.

Description
The flowers are about 1 cm diameter, white or occasionally light purple, with yellow stamens. The fruit is a shiny black berry  diameter, containing numerous small seeds.

Taxonomy
Solanum americanum is a variable taxon. It is considered by some botanists to be more than one species, and others recognise subspecies. Some botanists have suggested that Solanum americanum may be conspecific with the European nightshade, S. nigrum.

Toxicity

Research indicates the presence of toxic glycoalkaloids and there are warnings to be careful on the use of S. americanum as herbal medicine and food. The green fruit is particularly poisonous and eating unripe berries has caused the death of children.  Ripe berries and foliage may also cause poisoning, though the toxicity seems to diminish somewhat with ripening. This is via high levels of the glycoalkaloids, solanine and solamargine. Other toxins present in the plant include chaconine, solasonine, solanigrine, gitogenin and traces of saponins, as well as the tropane alkaloids scopolamine (hyoscine), atropine and hyoscyamine.

Significant amounts of solasodine (0.65%) have been found in the green berries.  The ripe fruit also contains 0.3–0.45% solasonine, and acetylcholine, and has a cholinesterase-inhibiting effect on human plasma. In Transkei, rural people have a high incidence of esophageal cancer thought to be a result of using S. americanum as a food. Livestock can also be poisoned by high nitrate levels in the leaves.

Toxicity varies widely depending on the genetic strain and the location conditions, like soil and rainfall. Poisonous plant experts advise: "...unless you are certain that the berries are from an edible strain, leave them alone."

See also
Sobemovirus

References

External links

Solanum americanum: Occurrence data from Global Biodiversity Information Facility

Pacific Island Ecosystems at Risk: Solanum americanum (very detailed description)
Identifying nightshades as weeds

 — Images, specimens and a full list of scientific synonyms. Full descriptions and identification keys coming soon!
Plants for a future

americanum
Flora of Hawaii
Medicinal plants
Plants used in traditional African medicine
Plants described in 1768
Taxa named by Philip Miller